Projektron BCS is a web-based project management software for planning, managing and controlling a multitude of projects simultaneously.

Distribution 
The software is currently used in 9 countries by a total of approximately 37,000 users. Users are E.ON, Nintendo, the German National Library, the HanseMerkur Versicherungsgruppe, UniVersa Versicherungen and Hella  Aglaia Mobile Vision.

Technology 

Projektron BCS is a 3-tier software, based on Java.

The user-interface is used in an internet-browser without plugins, ActiveX, local Java applets.

It supports Oracle, PostgreSQL and Microsoft SQL as databases.

Manufacturer and development history 

The manufacturer of Projektron BCS is the Berlin-based Projektron GmbH. The company was founded in 2001 by Dr Marten Huisinga, Maik Dorl and Jörg Cohrs.

The initial aim was to provide a web-based, platform-independent, easily configurable software for project management.

Over the years, other functions were added:

2001: Projektron BCS is available in the first version.

2002: Projektron BCS supports dependencies and milestones as well as the possibility to compare several projects with each other. Also added is a notification system via e-mails that indicate project changes.

2003: Projektron BCS offers an interface to Microsoft Outlook and an English-language interface.

2004: The Resource Management module is presented at CeBIT. The new report generator for reporting will be presented at Systems.

2005: Version 5.0 now offers the Top-down and Bottom-up|Top-Down-Budget planning, Functions for invoice creation, the import of e-mails via IMAP or POP3 and an order management system that can also include subsidies. The file storage was adapted to the WebDAV-standard adapted.

2006: The contract management module was presented at CeBIT. In addition, Projektron BCS now offers interfaces to SAP and Microsoft Exchange as well as a ticket module with which customer enquiries and error messages can be managed. Version 6.0 offers a completely revised user interface, based on AJAX-Technology.

2007: The management of expenses and holidays as well as resource-oriented scheduling are supported by Projektron BCS.

2008: At CeBIT, the project portfolio management, an interface to the open-source reporting framework BIRT and the Spanish surface were presented. The new offer generation supports service providers who carry out projects on behalf of customers.

2009: The support of Flexitimemodels, Milestone trend analysis, a project completion assistant and the archiving of multiple baselines are added. The agile procedure model Scrum is supported and a French interface is offered.

2010: The multi-currency capability allows working with several currencies within one project. The Computer Telephony Integration (CTI) ensures that Projektron BCS can be connected to telephone systems. Address data can be visualised on a map via the interface to BGI ThematicMapper. The head office moves from Kreuzberg to Berlin-Mitte.

2011: Mobile time recording via smartphones will be presented at CeBIT. The project preparation offers functions such as target cross, considers project environment and stakeholders. The user interface is also available in Dutch, Italian and Hungarian.

2012: Completely revised user interface in version 7.0. New edition Projektron BCS.start for project teams with up to 15 employees.

2013: Projektron BCS offers an external support portal, new options for automated project invoicing, a JIRA interface as well as visualisations in the form of tachometers on costs, effort and profit. The user conference will be held for the first time.

2014: Efforts can now also be recorded via app using the smartphone. There is also a new planning view for the Scrum module and profile pictures for project work.

2015: The JIRA interface becomes bidirectional and new solutions for resource management in the matrix organisation are offered. A full-text search and new tagging and reuse functions have been added to the ticket system.

2016: Phase plans support multi-project management, the ticket system receives an extension for service times, response times and advance warning levels to ensure service quality, project ideas can be recorded and submitted with the help of an assistant.

2017: In the project application, the radar chart shows the strategic importance of the project with and without weighting, project applications can be compared and the Kanban Board can be used for tickets and tasks for a quick overview.

2018: Calendar synchronisation via the cloud-based Office 365 is supported and the new app records expenses and costs offline.

2019: Costs can be viewed over time and compared directly with the planned values and Projektron BCS offers the possibility to conduct surveys and evaluate their results directly in the software. The software has also been given a new design.

2020: More efficient rights management is made possible thanks to the possibility of defining user licences and roles for groups of people. In addition, the resource utilisation has been revised and a Polish interface is offered.

See also 
List of project management software

References

External links 
Projektron official site
Article of "Projekt Magazin" of the usage of Projektron BCS at EADS
Projectmanagement-Study of BARC
Description at pm-software.info
The magazine of the german "Gesellschaft für Projektmanagement" about Projektron BCS
Edicos' experiences with Projektron BCS

Project management software
2001 software
Projects established in 2001